Allan Leyland is a male former wrestler who competed for England.

Wrestling career
He represented England in the -52 kg division at the 1954 British Empire and Commonwealth Games in Vancouver, Canada.

References

English male wrestlers
Wrestlers at the 1954 British Empire and Commonwealth Games
Commonwealth Games competitors for England